Randy Ray may refer to:

 A pseudonym of Randy Travis, used for example on his 1982 live album Randy Ray: Live at the Nashville Palace
 Randy Ray (born 1979), one of the Ray brothers
 Randy Ray, a member of Legend Seven